Gashaka is a Local Government Area in Taraba State, Nigeria. Its headquarters are in the town of Serti.

It has an area of 8,393 km and a population of 87,781 at the 2006 census.
  
The postal code of the area is 672.
The Lamdo (Emir) of Gashaka is Alhaji Zubairu Hammangabdo Muhammadu Sambo, was installed on 28 January 2017 after the demise of his father Alh. Hammangabdo Muhammadu Sambo who had ruled the Gashaka kingdom for 51 year, died on 23 October 2016 at the age of 81.
Fulani is the major spoken language in Gashaka and Serti town.

References

Local Government Areas in Taraba State